Egyptian Room may refer to:

 Egyptian Club (also known as Egyptian Room), a lesbian bar in Portland, Oregon
 Egyptian Room (Indianapolis), an event space at the Old National Centre in Indianapolis